The 2019–20 Elon Phoenix men's basketball team represents Elon University during the 2019–20 NCAA Division I men's basketball season. The Phoenix, led by first-year head coach Mike Schrage, play as sixth-year members of the Colonial Athletic Association and play their home games at the Schar Center.

Previous season
The Phoenix finished the 2018–19 season 11–20, 7–11 in CAA play to finish in a two-way tie for sixth place. They lost in the first round of the CAA tournament to UNC Wilmington.

Following the season, head coach Matt Matheny was fired and former Ohio State assistant coach Mike Schrage was hired.

Offseason

Departures

2019 recruiting class

Incoming transfers

Roster

Schedule and results

|-
!colspan=9 style=| Exhibition 

|-
!colspan=9 style=| Non-conference regular season 

|-
!colspan=9 style=| CAA regular season

|-
!colspan=9 style=| CAA tournament

Source:

References

Elon Phoenix men's basketball seasons
Elon
Elon